Lena Wermelt (born 29 September 1990 in Steinfurt) is a German footballer, playing for HSV Borussia Friedenstal in the Fußball-Bundesliga (women).

References

External links 
 Lena Wermelt at framba.de 

1990 births
Living people
People from Steinfurt
Sportspeople from Münster (region)
German women's footballers
Women's association football defenders
FFC Heike Rheine players
Footballers from North Rhine-Westphalia